Constantin Stanciu (24 September 1907 – 27 March 1986) was a Romanian football forward.

Career
Stanciu made a total of eight appearances over his career and scored four goals for the Romania national team.  His career in club football was spent at Venus București between 1923 and 1927, he played for Fulgerul Chișinău in 1926–1927 and he returned to Venus București. He then played for Juventus București until 1939, and he terminated his career in 1939 with Metalosport București.

International career
Constantin Stanciu played 8 games and scored four goals at international level for Romania, making his debut on 15 September 1929 when coach Constantin Rădulescu sent him on the field in the 65th minute in order to replace Nicolae Kovács in a friendly which ended with a 3–2 away victory against Bulgaria. He played three games at the 1929–31 Balkan Cup, scoring a double in a 5–2 victory against Bulgaria as Romania won the competition. He was part of Romania's squad at the 1930 World Cup playing in the first game, a 3–1 victory against Peru in which he was heavily tackled in the first half by Luis de Souza and Alberto Denegri, walking limping in the second half of the game as no substitutions were allowed, managing to score the 2–1 goal with his injured leg. Stanciu played his last two games for the national team in the victorious 1931–1934 Central European Cup for Amateurs, scoring a goal in a 4–1 victory against Czechoslovakia.

International goals
Scores and results list Romania's goal tally first. "Score" column indicates the score after the player's goal.

Honours
Venus București
Divizia A: 1928–29, 1931–32, 1933–34
Romania
Balkan Cup: 1929–31
Central European International Cup: 1931–34

References

External links

Footballers from Bucharest
Romanian footballers
Romania international footballers
Liga I players
Venus București players
FC Petrolul Ploiești players
1930 FIFA World Cup players
1907 births
1986 deaths
Association football forwards
Romanian football managers
FCV Farul Constanța managers